Michael Roy Freeman (born 9 December 1960) is a New Zealand chess player.

He was NZ Correspondence Champion in 1979/80 and 1983/84, and earned a NZ Correspondence Chess Master title. In 1995 he gained an International Correspondence Master title (2450 level) and in 2003 he won the International Correspondence Chess Federation (ICCF) 50th anniversary IM-D event and gained a Senior International Master title.

Over the board Freeman has represented NZ in chess at the 1996 Chess Olympiad and the 1983, 1993 and 1995 Asian Teams events and was NZ Team Captain for four Chess Olympiads (1994, 1996, 1998, 2000) and a member of the FIDE Executive Board from 1998 to 2002. He is the current FIDE delegate and also the NZ delegate to ICCF.

Freeman is also webmaster of the NZ Chess website www.nzchess.co.nz.

Freeman is a civil servant working for the Stratford District Council.

References

External links
Official NZCF Website
Stratford District Council

1960 births
Living people
New Zealand chess players
Chess officials
University of Canterbury alumni